Worldwide Broadcasting Channel was a free-to-air news channel operated by Worldview Broadcasting Channel (M) Sdn Bhd. The channel was officially launched on 1 April 2012. In October 2012, the channel stopped transmission due to financial problem.

It started test transmission on 1 December 2011. It can be normally tuned on UHF 39 (615.25 MHz) in Klang Valley and Selangor). Its test transmission time is 6 p.m. to 12 a.m. It broadcasts from its headquarters in Petronas Twin Towers at Jalan Ampang, Kuala Lumpur. It was test of transmission on 1 January 2012, pre-launched on Thursday, 1 March 2012 and officially launched it started began broadcasting metropolitan on 1 April 2012. WBC broadcasts for six hours daily from 18:00 until 00:00 MST. WBC currently broadcasts via UHF on Channel 39 with video frequency used 615.250-MHz & audio frequency used 620.750-MHz from Gunung Ulu Kali raised as high at 20 kilowatt and obtained form antenna by 300 metre.

On 1 March 2012, TV3 news broadcast was aired live from Bandar Utama, Damansara, Petaling Jaya, Selangor on WBC in daily at 20:00 until 21:00 MST. On 2 April 2012, WBC and KLSE partnership called as "Bisnes Kuala Lumpur (Kuala Lumpur Business)" is a business and financial news programmes a subsidiary of KLSE. Malay newspaper carries the television schedule listings of the channel was officially launched on 1 April 2012.

History

Established
WBC was established on 1 October 2011 a private commercial owned company it starting founded.

Technical of Transmission
WBC was first technical aired on 1 November 2011 by the coverage of broadcast air time only for the area of Klang Valley with a technical broadcasts used is only a few hours per day to play an Indonesian music.

Test of Transmission
WBC was test of transmission by airing music video mostly in Indonesian on 1 January 2012 from 18:00 until 20:00 MST on daily.

Pre-launched
WBC was pre-launched on 1 March 2012 18:00 until 21:00 MST daily will one day before the official broadcast metropolitan of pre-inaugural broadcast area of Klang Valley on Channel 39 video frequency used 615.250-MHz and audio frequency used 620.750-MHz via UHF with television transmitter of tower at Menara TV3 form complex of Bukit Sungai Besi form 1 March until Saturday, 31 March 2012 it was content broadcast used ofter two programmes (news relayed & movie premiere) such.

Grand Launching of WBC: "Welcome to WBC"
WBC was officially inaugurated by Toni Braxton was accompanied by Ecstasia Sanders and Agam Darshi on 1 April 2012 at 21:00 MST to start the live telecast of "Grand Launching" from Petronas Twin Towers was grand opening by the Kuala Lumpur commercial free-to-air terrestrial channel with signature inscription and pressing the button on the video camera add new broadcast hours longer than six hour transmissions from 18:00 until 00:00 MST daily went on air in Klang Valley on Channel 39 with the was aired full programmes to full content broadcast such: drama, music video, news bulletin, blockbuster movie premiere and current affairs.

Broadcast area
WBC broadcast coverage area was in Klang Valley and Selangor.

Transmission hours
Transmission hours are from eighteen hours in daily.

1 January – 29 February 2012 (Test of Transmission)
18:00-20:00 MST (two hours daily).
1 – 31 March 2012 (Pre-launched)
18:00-21:00 MST (three hours daily).
1 April – 31 October 2012
18:00-00:00 MST (six hours daily).

Test Card
WBC Feed
Multiburst with the text in the under box "WORLDVIEW BROADCASTING CHANNEL" (down to central font) with beep as the test card.

Clock ident
The clock had used by the digital clock is used to countdown to the top of the hour as a lead-in to live news bulletins and Islamic call prayer.

News
Berita WBC/WBC News with similar to the narration Buletin Utama TV3 by the metropolitan map background, metropolitan landmark and video news slideshow with similar to the Berita RTM Era 70-80s main theme music.

Opening and Closing times

Startup
WBC starts up with test pattern (pre-start up), national anthem was broadcasts the begin  and station ident.

Closedown
WBC closes down with station ident, national anthem and test pattern was broadcasts the end.

References 

Television stations in Malaysia
Television channels and stations established in 2012
Malay language television stations
Television channels and stations disestablished in 2012